The Magic Gown is an Azerbaijani film directed by Alisattar Atakishiyev in 1964.

Plot 
In the film, with the help of the famous illusionist Io Kio, children travel to the past and the future. Here, both periods are viewed through the eyes of the children of that period.

Cast 
Rashid Mirzayev - main role - Azer Gurbanov
Zarifa - the main role - Solmaz Hatamova
Petya - the main role - Kolya Loginov
Eldar - main role - Yusif Sheikhov
Khan - Aliagha Aghayev
Io-Kio - Anatoly Falkovich
Mohsun Aghayev — Mohsun Sanani
Chief Vizier - Aghahussein Javadov
Referee - Ismail Osmanly
Vizier - Husseinagha Sadygov
Astrologer - Mammad Sadygov
Serdar — Afrasiyab Mammadov
The old man - Alekber  Husseinzade
Merchant - Ali Khalilov
Merchant - Mammadsadyg Nuriyev
Commander - Bahadur Aliyev
Policeman - Talat Rahmanov
Treasurer - Mollagha Babirli
Teacher "in the future" - Lutfi Mammadbeyli
Sakina - Almaz Ahmedova
Sage - Nazim Mustafayev
Circus artist - Arif Madatov

References 

1964 films
Soviet-era Azerbaijanian films